Lutfar Rahman Sarkar (1930s – 24 June 2013) was a Bangladeshi economist who served as the sixth Governor of Bangladesh Bank, the central bank of Bangladesh during 1996–1998. He served as a part-time faculty member of the University of Dhaka.

Career
Sarkar served as the executive president and chief executive officer of Islami Bank Bangladesh Ltd.

References

External links

2013 deaths
1930s births
Bangladeshi economists
Governors of Bangladesh Bank
Bangladeshi bankers
Honorary Fellows of Bangla Academy
Place of birth missing
Year of birth missing